Çaltıkoru Dam is a dam in Izmir Province, Turkey, built between 1996 and 2002. The development was backed by the Turkish State Hydraulic Works.

See also
List of dams and reservoirs in Turkey

External links
DSI directory, State Hydraulic Works (Turkey), Retrieved December 16, 2009

Dams in İzmir Province